Paul Daly (born 28 March 1972) is a Northern Irish international lawn bowler.

Bowls career

International
Daly won a silver medal in the men's triples at the 2014 Commonwealth Games. He also won a bronze medal in the triples and fours at the 2012 World Outdoor Bowls Championship.

National Championships
Daly is a six times Irish National Bowls Championships winner, including winning the singles title in 2011, bowling for Ulster Transport Bowls Club. 

His first title came in 1993 in the fours for Belmont BC and followed this up in 1996 when winning the triples in 1996, again for Belmont. Nine years later in 2005, he won the triples bowling for Ulster Transport BC. In 2011, he won the triples in addition to the singles. He later switched clubs moving back to the Belmont club.

In 2022, he won his sixth national title when winning the fours at the Irish National Bowls Championships.

References

1972 births
Living people
Commonwealth Games silver medallists for Northern Ireland
Bowls players at the 2014 Commonwealth Games
Male lawn bowls players from Northern Ireland
Commonwealth Games medallists in lawn bowls
Medallists at the 2014 Commonwealth Games